The Schattenberg is a wooded mountain southwest of Jugel and northeast of  Hirschenstand (Jelení) in the western Bohemian Ore Mountains, which is 950 metres high. East of the mountain lies the 980-metre-high Scheffelsberg and to the north is the 973-metre-high Buchschachtelberg. These three mountains form the main crest in this part of the Ore Mountains.

A footpath runs immediately past the Schattenberg that, in winter, is used as a cross-country skiing trail.

Literature 
Wander- und Wintersportkarte des Erzgebirges, Sheet 3 - Auersberg, im Auftrag des Sächs. Finanzministeriums published by the  Reichsamt für Landesaufnahme, 1928.

Mountains and hills of the Czech Republic
Mountains of the Ore Mountains